The Jimmy Giuffre Quartet in Person is a live album by American jazz composer and arranger Jimmy Giuffre which was released on the Verve label in 1959.

Reception

Allmusic awarded the album 3 stars.

Track listing 
All compositions by Jimmy Giuffre except as indicated
 "The Quiet Time" - 9:30
 "The Crab" - 8:27
 "My Funny Valentine" (Richard Rodgers, Lorenz Hart) - 8:00
 "Wee See" (Thelonious Monk) - 9:22
 "What's New?" (Bob Haggart, Johnny Burke) - 6:30
 "Two for Timbuctu" - 6:57

Personnel 
Jimmy Giuffre - clarinet, tenor saxophone
Jim Hall - guitar 
Buell Neidlinger - bass
Billy Osborne - drums

References 

Jimmy Giuffre live albums
1960 live albums
Verve Records live albums
Albums recorded at the Five Spot Café